Lewis Coady (born 20 September 1976) is an English former professional footballer who played as a midfielder. He made appearances in the English Football League with Wrexham and Doncaster Rovers, however spent most of his career playing in the Welsh Premier League.

References

1976 births
Living people
Wrexham A.F.C. players
Colwyn Bay F.C. players
Doncaster Rovers F.C. players
Porthmadog F.C. players
Caernarfon Town F.C. players
Bangor City F.C. players
English footballers
Association football midfielders
English Football League players